The 2022–23 Sam Houston Bearkats men's basketball team represents Sam Houston State University in the 2022–23 NCAA Division I men's basketball season. The Bearkats, led by 13th-year head coach Jason Hooten, play their home games at the Bernard Johnson Coliseum in Huntsville, Texas as members of the Western Athletic Conference.

Previous season
The Bearkats finished the 2021–22 season 19–14, 13–5 in WAC play to finish in a tie for fourth place. In the WAC tournament, they defeated California Baptist in the second round, before falling to Grand Canyon in the third round.

Roster

Schedule and results

|-
!colspan=12 style=| Non-conference regular season

|-
!colspan=12 style=| WAC regular season

|-
!colspan=9 style=| WAC tournament

|-
!colspan=9 style=| NIT

Sources

References

Sam Houston Bearkats men's basketball seasons
Sam Houston Bearkats
Sam Houston Bearkats men's basketball
Sam Houston Bearkats men's basketball
Sam Houston